Owen Cunningham Wilson (born November 18, 1968) is an American actor. He has had a long association with filmmaker Wes Anderson with whom he shared writing and acting credits for Bottle Rocket (1996), Rushmore (1998), and The Royal Tenenbaums (2001), the last of which earned him a nomination for the Academy Award and BAFTA Award for Best Screenplay. He has also appeared in Anderson's The Life Aquatic with Steve Zissou (2004), The Darjeeling Limited (2007), Fantastic Mr. Fox (2009), The Grand Budapest Hotel (2014), and The French Dispatch (2021). Wilson also starred in the Woody Allen romantic comedy Midnight in Paris (2011) as unsatisfied screenwriter Gil Pender, a role which earned him a Golden Globe Award nomination. In 2014 he appeared in Paul Thomas Anderson's Inherent Vice, and Peter Bogdanovich's She's Funny That Way.

Wilson is also known for his career as an onscreen comedian and member of the Frat Pack, which included starring roles in such comedies as Zoolander (2001), Starsky & Hutch (2004), Wedding Crashers (2005), You, Me and Dupree (2006), How Do You Know (2010), The Big Year (2011), and The Internship (2013). He is also known for the family films Marley and Me (2008), and the Night at the Museum film series (2005–2014). He voices Lightning McQueen in the Cars film series (2006–present), the title character in Marmaduke (2010) and Reggie in Free Birds (2013). He stars as Mobius M. Mobius in the Marvel Cinematic Universe series Loki (2021–present) streaming on Disney+.

Wilson's accolades include an Oscar and BAFTA nomination for Best Original Screenplay (for The Royal Tenenbaums), a Golden Globe and two SAG acting nominations (for Midnight in Paris and The Grand Budapest Hotel) and an Independent Spirit Award (for Inherent Vice).

Early life
Wilson was born in Dallas, the middle child of three sons of photographer Laura Cunningham Wilson (born 1939) and Robert Andrew Wilson (1941–2017), an advertising executive and operator of a public television station. His brothers Andrew and Luke are also actors. Wilson's parents are of Irish descent. He attended New Mexico Military Institute, amongst other schools. He later attended the University of Texas at Austin, where he pursued a Bachelor of Arts degree in English, but did not graduate. While in college, he met and was roommates with director and frequent collaborator Wes Anderson.

Career

1990s 
After his film debut in Bottle Rocket (1996), Wilson co-wrote with Wes Anderson the script for Anderson's next two directorial films, Rushmore and The Royal Tenenbaums, for which they garnered an Oscar nomination for Best Original Screenplay. While Wilson did not act in Rushmore he appears briefly in a photograph in the film. Wilson then landed a role in The Cable Guy, directed by Ben Stiller, an early admirer of Bottle Rocket. After appearing in supporting roles in action films like Anaconda and Armageddon and the horror film The Haunting, Wilson appeared in two dramatic roles: a supporting role in Permanent Midnight, which starred Stiller as a drug-addicted TV writer; and the lead role (as a serial killer) in The Minus Man, in which his future girlfriend, singer Sheryl Crow, was a co-star.

2000s 

Wilson starred in the 2000 comedy action film Shanghai Noon alongside Jackie Chan. The film grossed nearly $100 million worldwide. His fame continued to rise after starring alongside Ben Stiller and Will Ferrell in the 2001 film Zoolander. Gene Hackman reportedly took notice of Wilson's performance in Shanghai Noon and recommended the actor to co-star in the 2001 action film Behind Enemy Lines. Also in 2001, Wilson and Anderson collaborated on their third film, The Royal Tenenbaums, a financial and critical success. The film earned the writing team an Academy Award nomination for Best Original Screenplay.

Wilson returned to the buddy-comedy genre in 2002 with the action comedy I Spy, co-starring Eddie Murphy. The big-screen remake of the same-named television series did not perform well at the box office. He made a cameo appearance in the Girl Skateboards video Yeah Right! in 2003. He then reunited with Chan to make Shanghai Knights (2003), and co-starred in the film remake of the 1970s television series Starsky & Hutch (2004). Due to his busy schedule as an actor and an ongoing sinus condition, Wilson was unavailable to collaborate on the script for Wes Anderson's fourth feature film, The Life Aquatic with Steve Zissou. The 2004 film was ultimately co-written by filmmaker Noah Baumbach. However, Wilson did star in the film as Bill Murray's would-be son, Ned Plimpton; it was a role written specifically for him. In 2004, he and his brother Luke played the Wright brothers in the 2004 film Around the World in 80 Days. Wilson is said to be attached to a sequel to Shanghai Knights, marking his third collaboration with Jackie Chan.

Wilson partnered with Vince Vaughn in the 2005 comedy film Wedding Crashers, which grossed over $200 million in the US alone. Also in 2005, Owen collaborated with his brothers in The Wendell Baker Story, written by Luke and directed by Luke and Andrew. In 2006, Wilson voiced Lightning McQueen in the Disney/Pixar film Cars, starred in You, Me and Dupree with Kate Hudson, and appeared with Stiller in Night at the Museum as cowboy Jedediah.

Wilson has starred with Ben Stiller in twelve films, including The Cable Guy (1996), Permanent Midnight (1998), Meet the Parents (2000), Zoolander (2001), The Royal Tenenbaums (2001), Starsky & Hutch (2004), Meet the Fockers (2004), Night at the Museum (2006), and the sequels Night at the Museum 2: Battle of the Smithsonian (2009), Little Fockers (2010), Night at the Museum: Secret of the Tomb (2014) and Zoolander 2 (2016).

Wilson appeared in another Wes Anderson film, The Darjeeling Limited, which screened at the 45th annual New York Film Festival, the Venice Film Festival, and opened September 30, 2007. It co-stars Jason Schwartzman and Adrien Brody. The Darjeeling Limited was selected for a DVD and Blu-ray release by The Criterion Collection in October 2010. Wilson next starred in the Judd Apatow comedy, Drillbit Taylor which was released in March 2008. He appeared in a film adaptation of John Grogan's best-selling memoir, Marley & Me (2008), co-starring Jennifer Aniston.

He provided the voice for the Whackbat Coach Skip in Wes Anderson's Fantastic Mr. Fox. He starred in the film The Big Year, an adaptation of Mark Obmascik's book The Big Year: A Tale of Man, Nature and Fowl Obsession. The film was released in October 2011 by 20th Century Fox, and co-starred Jack Black, JoBeth Williams, Steve Martin and Rashida Jones.

Wilson is a member of the comedic acting brotherhood colloquially known as the Frat Pack. Wilson made a guest appearance on the NBC comedy Community with fellow Frat Pack member Jack Black.

2010s 

In 2011, Wilson starred as a nostalgia-seized writer in the romantic comedy Midnight in Paris, written and directed by Woody Allen. The film premiered at the 64th Cannes Film Festival to critical acclaim. Wilson earned a Golden Globe Award for his performance. The film became Allen's highest grossing thus far, and was also well received by critics.

Wilson returned to voice McQueen in Cars 2. In March 2012, Wilson was signed to star in the John Erick Dowdle thriller The Coup, later renamed "No Escape", in which he played the role of the father of an American family that moves to Southeast Asia, only to find itself swept up in a wave of rebel violence that is overwhelming the city. The film was not released until 2015, and was Wilson's return to the action genre for the first time since Behind Enemy Lines in 2001. He also voiced turkey Reggie in Reel FX's first animated film, Free Birds.

In 2014, Wilson appeared in Wes Anderson's acclaimed ensemble comedy The Grand Budapest Hotel and in Paul Thomas Anderson's book adaptation of Inherent Vice. In 2015, he starred with Jennifer Aniston in Peter Bogdanovich's film She's Funny That Way, and in the action thriller film No Escape alongside Lake Bell and Pierce Brosnan. Wilson's films have grossed more than 2.25 billion domestically (United States and Canada), with an average of 75M per film. In 2017, Wilson again voiced Lightning McQueen in Cars 3, played a suburban father in the drama Wonder, and co-starred with Ed Helms in the comedy Father Figures.

In November 2017, Wilson became the face of a new £20 million advertising campaign for the UK sofa retailer Sofology. He returned to work with Sofology in 2019 for a second advertising campaign.

2020s 
In 2021, Wilson starred in the comedy film Bliss, directed by Mike Cahill opposite Salma Hayek for Amazon Studios. In 2021, Wilson also reunited with Wes Anderson for The French Dispatch, which premiered at the 2021 Cannes Film Festival. and Marry Me alongside Jennifer Lopez and directed by Kat Coiro for Universal Pictures.

Wilson is currently starring in the Marvel Cinematic Universe series Loki opposite Tom Hiddleston on Disney+ as Mobius M. Mobius. He also signed on to star in a new film adaptation of The Haunted Mansion.

Personal life 
In August 2007, Wilson attempted suicide and was subsequently treated for depression at St. John's Health Center and Cedars-Sinai Medical Center in Los Angeles. A few days after his hospitalization, Wilson withdrew from his role in Tropic Thunder, which was produced by and co-starred his friend and frequent collaborator Ben Stiller and was replaced by Matthew McConaughey. The incident resulted in much unwanted publicity for Wilson, and he has been wary of doing interviews ever since. However, Wilson opened up about his suicide attempt with an article with Esquire in 2021, 14 years to the month after the event. Within the article, Wilson described how his older brother, Andrew, supported him during his recovery.

In January 2011, Wilson and his then-girlfriend Jade Duell had a son. Wilson and Duell ended their relationship later that year. In January 2014, he had a son with Caroline Lindqvist. He had a third child, a daughter, in October 2018 with ex-girlfriend Varunie Vongsvirates. Although Wilson has no relationship with his third child, he pays monthly child support.

Filmography

Film

Television

Video games

Music videos

Commercials

Awards and nominations

See also 
Frat Pack, group of actors he has appeared in several films with

References

External links 

 
 
 

1968 births
20th-century American male actors
21st-century American male actors
Film producers from Texas
American male film actors
American male screenwriters
American male television actors
American male voice actors
American people of Irish descent
Living people
Male actors from Austin, Texas
Male actors from Dallas
New Mexico Military Institute alumni
St. Mark's School (Texas) alumni
University of Texas at Austin College of Liberal Arts alumni
Writers from Austin, Texas
Screenwriters from Texas
Frat Pack